Sydney Grammar School (SGS, known colloquially as Grammar) is an independent, fee-paying, non-denominational day school for boys, located in Sydney, Australia.

Incorporated in 1854 by Act of Parliament and opened in 1857, the school claims to offer a "classical" or "grammar" school education thought of as liberal, humane, pre-vocational pedagogy.

As of 2006, Sydney Grammar School had an enrolment of approximately 1,841 students from kindergarten to Year 12, over three campuses. The two preparatory schools (K to 6), are located at Edgecliff in Sydney's Eastern Suburbs, and St Ives, on the Upper North Shore. The College Street campus caters for students from Forms I to VI (Years 7–12), and is in Darlinghurst.

The school is affiliated with the Association of Heads of Independent Schools of Australia (AHISA), the Junior School Heads Association of Australia (JSHAA), the Headmasters' and Headmistresses' Conference, and is a founding member of the Athletic Association of the Great Public Schools of New South Wales (AAGPS).   

As of 2019, it ranked the 3rd most expensive school in Australia with an average annual school fee of $36,615 per student.

History

Foundation

The Sydney Public Free Grammar School opened in 1825 with Laurence Hynes Halloran, born County Meath, Ireland (1765–1831) as Head Master. Halloran had operated a private school in Exeter, England, but fled England in 1796 due to debts and after being accused of immorality. It subsequently emerged that his degrees (in divinity) were self-awarded. He eventually returned to Britain but was arrested for forgery and transported to the penal colony of New South Wales, arriving there in 1819. He was immediately granted a ticket-of-leave.

In 1830, Sydney College was founded. Sir Francis Forbes, Chief Justice of New South Wales, became president of the college and laid the foundation stone of the present building in College Street on 26 January 1830. In 1835, Sydney College opened in this building with W.T. Cape as Head Master. In 1842 he resigned and was succeeded by T.H. Braim. In 1850 Sydney College was closed.

In 1854, Sydney Grammar School (SGS) was incorporated by an Act of Parliament and acquired the land and building in College Street which had been temporarily occupied by the newly founded University of Sydney in 1852. It was opened on 3 August 1857, specifically as a feeder school for the university.

The preamble of the Sydney Grammar School Act 1854 states that:
It is deemed expedient for the better advancement of religion and morality and the promotion of useful knowledge to establish in Sydney a public school for conferring on all classes and denominations of Her Majesty’s subjects resident in the Colony of New South Wales without any distinction whatsoever the advantages of a regular and liberal course of education. 
The act provides that the trustees of the school shall consist of twelve persons, of whom six shall be persons holding the following offices respectively:
The Honourable the Attorney-General of New South Wales
The Honourable the President of the New South Wales Legislative Council
The Honourable the Speaker of the New South Wales Legislative Assembly
The Chancellor of the University of Sydney
The Principal Professor of Classics of the University of Sydney
The Senior Professor of Mathematics of the University of Sydney

The act also provides that the Governor of New South Wales shall be the official visitor of the school.

Site history 

Sydney Grammar School is the oldest school still in use in the City of Sydney, and is also historically significant as the site on which the University of Sydney began. The school also holds scientific significance as containing examples of early building materials and techniques in pre-Federation Australia.

The site was founded as The Sydney College in 1830, and the following year began operations in a new building in Hyde Park designed by Edward Hallen. It consisted of a single large room (now known as "Big School") with basement rooms beneath. Sydney College continued despite financial difficulties until 1853, when it was taken over by the fledgling University of Sydney until such time as the present Grose Farm site was ready for occupation. The site was then sold in 1856 to the trustees of the newly incorporated Sydney Grammar School, which had been established and endowed with a building fund by Act of Parliament. Edmund Blacket was commissioned to design extensions to the south and north of the Hallen building (now the North and South Blacket rooms), which were completed in 1856 and 1857 respectively. The "Big School" building became central to the Colonial Architect, James Barnet's vision for the cultural focus of Sydney Town.

The War Memorial wing, named for its position behind Big School's monument to the Great War, was built at the northern end of Big School in 1953 by the Scott brothers, at the cost of its double staircase. In 1876, the main building was extended to the east by Mansfield Brothers, and this extension was itself extended to the north and south in 1899 by John W Manson. The Science classrooms on Stanley Street were built in 1889–90. Other early buildings on the site, now demolished, included the Sergeant's Lodge, an ablutions block (known as the "White House") on Stanley Street, and a former postal sorting office on Yurong Street (now the Palladium building).

Today 

Sydney Grammar is a private school. Each year up to 26 full scholarships are offered to boys who show academic promise and who perform well in the scholarship examination. It is also regarded for its strong academic results: for example, in national government testing ('NAPLAN' testing), it is the best performing private school nationwide, and a top performer in the New South Wales Higher School Certificate where the median ATAR ('Australian Tertiary Admissions Ranking') of the school's students is around 95.

Tuition is A$36,615 per year (for Forms I – VI, non-boarding) which is payable in three instalments of $12,205 at the beginning of Terms I, II and III.

Sydney Grammar is located near the Sydney central business district. The campus is compact and consists of multi-storey buildings (of up to eight floors) in a concrete landscape setting. Sydney Grammar is situated on the eastern side of Sydney's Hyde Park, next to the Australian Museum, and extends from College Street to Yurong Street. The designs of the school's buildings illustrate many different architectural eras: "Big School" (dating from the early 19th century colonial era), the Blacket buildings (annexed onto either side of "Big School" and completed in the 1850s), the original Science building (1891), the Science laboratory block (1960s), the Palladium building (an example of 1970s Modernist architecture), the Stanley Street building and Alastair Mackerras Theatre (1980s), and the A. B. 'Banjo' Paterson Library (1990s).

Weigall, the school's sportsground (named after former Headmaster Albert Bythesea Weigall), is located at Rushcutters Bay next to the Edgecliff Preparatory School and includes tennis courts, cricket nets and three fields for cricket, rugby and football. It is routinely used for Saturday sports matches, physical education and as a recreational area for Grammar's Edgecliff Preparatory School next door. There is also a large gymnasium at College Street and full rowing facilities at the school's boatshed at Gladesville.

In May 2005, Headmaster John Vallance announced that the school would lead a consortium to purchase 30 Alma Street Paddington, known as White City, from Tennis New South Wales, thus extending the Weigall grounds substantially. In 2006, development applications to subdivide the White City tennis courts (numbered DA 20/2006 and DA 302/2006) were lodged with Woollahra Council to develop the site to accommodate more tennis and basketball courts; these were subsequently passed.

On 14 June 2008 the new field now known as Weigall 4 was opened with a range of guests including Frank Lowy, president of Football Federation Australia.

In 2009, the school began the construction of a new, underground multi-purpose hall featuring a seating capacity of over 1,500 seats, now called the John Vallance Hall (formerly The New Hall from its opening until 2017). Completed in August 2011, it was primarily designed to accommodate the entirety of the current students and teaching staff under one roof while being acoustically sound for orchestral performances.
The hall was officially opened by the headmaster on 18 August 2011 with a substantive celebratory concert featuring performances from a large number of Grammar boys past and present. The John Vallance Hall is now used by the two preparatory schools as well.

Headmasters 
The current headmaster of Sydney Grammar School is Richard Malpass, who replaced John Vallance when he resigned on 7 April 2017.

Structure 
Sydney Grammar has a total enrolment of approximately 1,833 boys across Years K–12. In Term Three of 2006, the main high School campus had an enrolment of 1,109 boys in Forms I–VI (Years 7–12).  The main high school is divided into the Lower School (First Form) and the Upper School (Second through Sixth Forms). There are also two Preparatory Schools, one at St. Ives in the Northern Suburbs (440 boys) and the other at Edgecliff in Rushcutters Bay, Eastern Suburbs (304 boys). Each year, approximately two-thirds of the incoming Form I at College Street are from the two Preparatory Schools, while the rest are drawn from schools in Sydney, from interstate and overseas.

Curriculum 

Sydney Grammar offers a liberal, pre-vocational type education, and this is reflected in its academic structure and subject choices. Every student must study Latin in 'First Form' or 7th Grade. The academic departments are:
Classics
Design and technology (currently known as applied arts)
Drama
Economics
English
Geography
History
Mathematics
Modern languages (Asian and European)
Music
Physical education
Science
Visual arts.
Subjects offered for the Higher School Certificate (HSC) include English Advanced, English Extension 1, English Extension 2, Mathematics, Mathematics Extension 1, Mathematics Extension 2, Chemistry, Physics, Biology, Earth and Environmental Science, Geography, Modern History, Ancient History, History Extension, Economics, Latin, Latin Extension, Classical Greek, Classical Greek Extension, French Continuers, French Extension, Italian Continuers, Italian Extension, German Continuers, German Extension, Chinese Continuers, Chinese Extension, Japanese Beginners, Music 1, Music 2, Music Extension, Visual Art, Drama, PDHPE, Design and Technology and Studies of Religion.
Sanskrit and Special Academic Courses are offered as non-HSC subjects.  The Special Academic courses previously included a Form V (Year 11) course in extension chemistry and physics and a Form VI (Year 12) course in lagrangian dynamics and quantum mechanics; they are currently centred around 19th Century Russian literature, with a focus on the works of Pushkin and Dostoevsky, with a smaller study of Chekhov and Nikolai Gogol.

Co-curriculum

Music 

SGS has won the AMEB Music Shield 23 times in the past 25 years. Two-thirds of pupils in the school play a musical instrument or are involved with music in some way. SGS has scores of musical groups in mostly classical, chamber and jazz styles. The School Orchestra engages in both national and international tours. Grammar's choir program involves hundreds of students, old boys, and parents, participating in its many annual concerts. The school's senior a cappella group is known as The Grammarphones and is composed of the best tenors, basses and baritones in the senior years. The school's senior big band, the Sydney Grammar School Big Band, is a regular feature at the Manly Jazz Festival.

SGS embarked on a five-year program entitled "Bach: 2010", in which all the known choral cantatas of Johann Sebastian Bach were performed in a series of concerts between 2005 and 2010. Sydney Grammar is one of the few institutions in the world that has engaged in such an exercise and was aided by the Mander organ in the Big School. A performance has been held every year since by head of practical music studies, Robert Wagner, on the Bach's birthday.

Under the current Head Master, an organic rock-&-roll movement has emerged and is currently thriving. The end of 2004 saw the consummation of years of practice in the first Grammarpalooza rock concert, which included the musical style of Old Boy band, Dappled Cities Fly.

Sport 

Sydney Grammar School is a member of the Athletic Association of the Great Public Schools of NSW (GPS), Australia's oldest school sporting association. GPS sporting events are contested in rugby union, football, cricket, tennis, volleyball, cross country, basketball, rowing, swimming, athletics, rifle shooting, and debating. The school also competes in fencing and chess competitions.

Grammar participates in the annual Tri-Grammar competitions, a series of cricket competitions between the Firsts teams of Sydney Grammar School, Melbourne Grammar School and Brisbane Grammar School. Sydney and Melbourne Grammar School also compete for "The Bat" in the same competition. The Sydney–Melbourne match dates back to 1876, and in 1976, to mark the centenary of this rivalry, a "Bat" was struck, with the winner of the annual match taking possession. The bat was donated by John Crawford, the father of the captain of the 1976 premiership winning side Andrew Crawford.

The school launched its rowing program in 1878, and has maintained it since. Competition in rowing culminates in the Riverview Gold Cup for Junior Crews and the Head of the River for Senior Crews. Grammar's boatshed is on the Parramatta River at Gladesville.

On 2 April 2011, Sydney Grammar School first eight won the Major Rennie Trophy at the AAGPS Head of the River. This marked the first victory for the school since 1978. In its history, Grammar has won the race sixteen times, the second highest number of victories after the Shore School. Many rowers have gone on to row in Varsity Crews at a university level. In the 2014–2015 Harvard University rowing roster, Sydney Grammar had the most rowers out of any high school globally and two Sydney Grammar rowers were in Harvard's top crew (First Varsity Eight).

Academic extension 
The school operates academic extension programmes in both sciences and humanities, which includes olympiad programmes and hosting visiting scholars who spend time teaching and giving a public lecture.  Notable scholars have included metaethicist Simon Blackburn, science and medical historian Sir Geoffrey Lloyd, zoologist Andrew Parker, astronomer and 1999 Young Australian of the Year Bryan Gaensler, historian Sir Christopher Clark, professor of English Dame Marina Warner, professor of Greek Richard Hunter, and composer Robin Holloway.

As part of an academic extension activity, a group of year 11 students attempted to prepare the medication pyrimethamine (sold as Daraprim) in 2016.  Pyrimethamine is on the World Health Organization's List of Essential Medicines, the most important medications needed in a basic health system, for both adults and children. It is used to treat toxoplasmosis, cystoisosporiasis, and malaria (in combination with sulfadoxine). It received significant attention when its manufacturer in the United States was acquired by Turing Pharmaceuticals, and its CEO Martin Shkreli decided to increase the price from US$13.50 to US$750 a dose. Hence, a group of year 11 students from Grammar, supported by Matthew H. Todd from the University of Sydney and the Open Source Malaria consortium, have prepared pyrimethamine. The students started with 17 g of (4-chlorophenyl)acetonitrile (which is available from Sigma-Aldrich for $36.50 per 100 g) and prepared 3.7 g of pyrimethamine, which is about US$110,000 at Turing's prices.

Their work has attracted attention from around the world, being reported in The Independent, the Daily Telegraph, and BBC News in the United Kingdom, the Washington Post, New York Daily News, and U.S. News & World Report in the United States, among others. By replacing expensive chemicals with alternatives available in a high school laboratory, they demonstrated that the synthesis can be carried out fairly simply and safely, and at a cost of approximately $2 per dose (US$1.48).  Business magazine Forbes described the work as figuratively "punch[ing] Martin Shkreli in the face" and as raising questions about pharmaceutical companies which do not do substantial amounts of research. Unfortunately, as a consequence of the closed distribution model which Turing employs in the United States, any competing company seeking to market a generic alternative to Daraprim (including using the approach the boys developed with their teacher) would need to compare their product with a sample of Daraprim provided directly by Turing; if Turing refuses to provide that sample, the competitor would need to undertake a complete new clinical trial, which creates a prohibitive barrier to entering the market.  The boys are quoted making comments highly critical of Shkreli's and Turing's behaviour, and have been applauded on social media with comments that their work highlights Shkreli's greed, though he has minimised their achievement.

Shkreli subsequently posted a video about the achievement, declaring his "delight" about students entering the STEM field, describing them as "proof that the 21st century economy will solve problems of human suffering through science and technology", and stating that "[w]e should congratulate these students for their interest in chemistry and all be excited about what is to come in the STEM-focused 21st century." The students presented their work at the Royal Australian Chemical Institute's NSW Organic Chemistry symposium alongside students at fourth-year undergraduate and postgraduate levels, as well as postdoctoral researchers.

Clubs and Societies 

The school has numerous clubs and societies for students. Notable examples include:
Australian Air Force Cadets (Established in 1942)
Australian Army Cadets (Founded in 1871 by School Headmaster Albert Bythesea Weigall, the Corps is one of the oldest military units in the nation, even predating the Australian Army.)
Creative Writing Club, run by notable author John Hughes
Chess Club
Duke of Edinburgh Award Scheme
Debating

A number of boys also assist in editing the school's yearly almanac, The Sydneian, over 400 editions of which have been produced since 1875.

Overseas tours

The school offers its students the opportunity to attend various overseas tours for educational (mainly linguistic) and cultural exchanges. The school has partnerships with some of the top schools around the world in cities such as Paris, Shanghai and Florence which students can visit for a period of between 3 and 12 weeks as a supplement for their linguistic studies; in addition to the time spent at the school, the boys also get the opportunity to travel around the respective countries on a cultural trip, accompanied by teachers. There are also frequent sporting tours overseas such as in Brazil for football, England for rugby and Japan for volleyball where the students can participate in matches against foreign teams and sometimes even train with and watch professional sports teams play. The school also offers tours for science, geography and history to areas such as the Galapagos to study evolution or to the Kokoda Track to follow in the footsteps of the ANZACs.

Notable alumni 

 
Alumnus of Sydney Grammar School are commonly referred to as Old Boys or Old Sydneians, and may elect to join the schools alumni association, the Old Sydneians' Union (OSU).

Grammar is notable for having educated the highest number of Rhodes Scholars, High Court judges (Australia's highest court) and the equal highest number of Australian Prime Ministers, out of any school in the country. Its alumni also include influential figures in business, international sport, science and medicine, and the performing arts, like David Gonski (leading Australian philanthropist, chairman of the Future Fund, chancellor of the New South Wales) and Rowan Gillies (former international president of Médecins Sans Frontières).

Notable alumni also include Sir Edmund Barton, the first Prime Minister of Australia (1901–1903), Sir William McMahon, 20th Prime Minister of Australia (1971–1972), Malcolm Turnbull, 29th Prime Minister of Australia (2015–2018), Bruce Gyngell, first person to appear on Australian television, Andrew "Boy" Charlton, an Olympic gold medallist swimmer, and also Banjo Paterson – bush poet and balladist, and author of "The Man From Snowy River" and "Waltzing Matilda," and who now has the school library named after him.

References

Further reading 
 Sheldon, J.S 1997. The Big School Room at Sydney Grammar School with an Account of the Decline & Fall of Sydney College. Sydney Grammar School Press, Sydney, NSW. .
 Turney, C. 1989. Grammar: A History of Sydney Grammar School 1819 – 1988. Allen & Unwin with Sydney Grammar School, Sydney, NSW. .

External links 
 Sydney Grammar School website
 The Old Sydneians Union

Educational institutions established in 1825
1850 disestablishments
Private secondary schools in Sydney
Member schools of the Headmasters' and Headmistresses' Conference
Boys' schools in New South Wales
Junior School Heads Association of Australia Member Schools
Private primary schools in Sydney
Edmund Blacket buildings in Sydney
Darlinghurst, New South Wales
St Ives, New South Wales
College Street, Sydney
Athletic Association of the Great Public Schools of New South Wales
Grammar schools in Australia